

A04A Antiemetics and antinauseants

A04AA Serotonin (5-HT3) antagonists
A04AA01 Ondansetron
A04AA02 Granisetron
A04AA03 Tropisetron
A04AA04 Dolasetron
A04AA05 Palonosetron
A04AA55 Palonosetron, combinations

A04AD Other antiemetics
A04AD01 Scopolamine
A04AD02 Cerium oxalate
A04AD04 Chlorobutanol
A04AD05 Metopimazine
A04AD10 Dronabinol
A04AD11 Nabilone
A04AD12 Aprepitant
A04AD13 Casopitant
A04AD14 Rolapitant
A04AD51 Scopolamine, combinations
A04AD54 Chlorobutanol, combinations
QA04AD90 Maropitant

References

A04